Gran Glaciar Norte is the largest ice cap and firn field in México. It is located on Pico de Orizaba (Volcán Citlaltépetl) which is the highest point in Mexico. It contains nine named glaciers, including seven outlet glaciers, and a mountain niche glacier.

See also 
List of glaciers in Mexico

References 

Landforms of Puebla
Landforms of Veracruz
Glaciers of Mexico